is a Japanese footballer.

Career statistics

Club

Notes

References

External links
 Takeshi Miki Official Website
Thaileague Official Website: Result

1986 births
Living people
Japanese footballers
Japanese expatriate footballers
Association football defenders
Singapore Premier League players
Boreham Wood F.C. players
Albirex Niigata Singapore FC players
Takeshi Miki
FK Sloboda Tuzla players
NK Krka players
Japanese expatriate sportspeople in England
Expatriate footballers in England
Japanese expatriate sportspeople in Singapore
Expatriate footballers in Singapore
Japanese expatriate sportspeople in Thailand
Expatriate footballers in Thailand
Expatriate footballers in Bosnia and Herzegovina
Japanese expatriate sportspeople in Croatia
Expatriate footballers in Croatia
Expatriate footballers in Slovenia